Dominique Savio Nshuti (born 1 January 1997) is a Rwandan footballer.

International career

International goals
Scores and results list Rwanda's goal tally first.

References

External links 
 

1997 births
Living people
Rwandan footballers
Rwanda international footballers
Association football midfielders
Rayon Sports F.C. players
People from Kigali
Rwanda A' international footballers
2016 African Nations Championship players
2018 African Nations Championship players
2020 African Nations Championship players